Lewis Clareburt (born 4 July 1999) is a New Zealand swimmer. He is the current Commonwealth men's champion for 200 metre butterfly and 400 metre individual medley, having won both events at the 2022 Commonwealth Games. At the 2018 Commonwealth Games and the 2019 World Aquatics Championships, he won bronze medals in the men's 400 m individual medley. He swam in the 2020 International Swim League, competing for the New York Breakers. He is coached by Gary Edward Hollywood at Capital Swim Club, Wellington.

In the second ISL season overall Lewis competed for the US-based swim team – New York Breakers.

References

External links
 

1999 births
Living people
Swimmers from Wellington City
Commonwealth Games bronze medallists for New Zealand
New Zealand male butterfly swimmers
Swimmers at the 2018 Commonwealth Games
Commonwealth Games medallists in swimming
World Aquatics Championships medalists in swimming
New Zealand male medley swimmers
Swimmers at the 2020 Summer Olympics
Olympic swimmers of New Zealand
20th-century New Zealand people
21st-century New Zealand people
Commonwealth Games gold medallists for New Zealand
Swimmers at the 2022 Commonwealth Games
Medallists at the 2018 Commonwealth Games
Medallists at the 2022 Commonwealth Games